Bank of Western Carolina, also known as Lexington State Bank (after 1966), is a historic bank building located at Lexington, Lexington County, South Carolina. It was built about 1912, and is a one-story, rectangular, brick building. It has a tiled hipped roof and features eave brackets and an arched entry.  It is one of five commercial buildings that survived the 1916 fire.  The building houses Bodhi Thai, a "fine dining" Thai restaurant.

It was listed on the National Register of Historic Places in 1983.

References

Bank buildings on the National Register of Historic Places in South Carolina
Commercial buildings completed in 1912
Buildings and structures in Lexington County, South Carolina
National Register of Historic Places in Lexington County, South Carolina
1912 establishments in South Carolina